The Women's Indoor Hockey Asia Cup is an international women's indoor hockey competition organized by the Asian Hockey Federation. The winning team becomes the champion of Asia. The tournament serves as a qualification tournament for the Women's Indoor Hockey World Cup.

The first edition was held in 2009.

Results

Top four statistics

* = hosts

Team appearances

See also
 Indoor hockey at the Asian Indoor and Martial Arts Games
 Men's Indoor Hockey Asia Cup
 Women's Hockey Asia Cup

References

External links
Asian Hockey Federation

 
Indoor Asia Cup
Indoor hockey
Recurring sporting events established in 2009
Asia